Xindu may refer to the following locations in China:

 Xindu District (新都区), Chengdu
 Xindu, Putian (新度镇), town in Licheng District, Putian, Fujian
 Xindu, Garzê, town in Garzê Prefecture, Sichuan